AGBO (also known as Gozie AGBO) is an independent entertainment company based in Downtown Los Angeles, founded and led by Anthony and Joe Russo and Mike Larocca. The Russo Brothers are best known for their work in the Marvel Cinematic Universe, most notably Avengers: Infinity War and Avengers: Endgame. Recent AGBO film releases include Extraction, written by Joe Russo and starring Chris Hemsworth; The Gray Man with Netflix in 2022; and Everything Everywhere All At Once.

History
In March 2015, the Russo brothers hired Mike Larocca as their president of production, with the company then known as Getaway Productions. In November 2015, it was announced that they would co-produce Deadly Class alongside creator Rick Remender for Syfy. AGBO closed its first overall TV deal with Midnight Radio in June 2018. Under this deal, Midnight Radio will create and produce original television programming for AGBO with projects in the works that include The Warriors for Netflix, based on the 1979 Walter Hill film of the same name, From, a horror series for YouTube Red, as well as the international spy series Citadel, starring Priyanka Chopra and Richard Madden, for Amazon Studios. AGBO also produced the docu-series Larry Charles' Dangerous World of Comedy, which premiered on Netflix on February 15, 2019.

The company made several film deals in August 2018, the first being Cherry, based on Nico Walker's novel of the same name, which the Russo Brothers will direct. Other deals announced shortly after included 21 Bridges for STX, which was released on November 22, 2019., and finally it was announced that Sam Hargrave would direct Dhaka, later renamed Extraction, from a screenplay by Joe Russo with Chris Hemsworth set to star in the film. The film was released on Netflix on April 24, 2020, and received the biggest premiere viewership in the site's history, leading to a sequel being put in development from the same team.

On March 10, 2020, the AGBO produced film Relic was acquired by IFC Midnight, with a theatrical release scheduled for July 10, 2020. More recently, Apple acquired Cherry, with the film set to have a theatrical run on February 26, 2021, before heading to Apple TV+ on March 12, 2021. More recently, the company signed a deal with Spotify. In January 2022, AGBO sold a $400 million minority stake to the video game developer Nexon, which is valued at $1.1 billion as Nexon takes a 38% stake.

Other projects in development
AGBO currently has several projects in various stages of development. For MGM, they will produce a remake of The Thomas Crown Affair with Michael B. Jordan set to star, alongside other remakes of MGM's library.

With Paramount Pictures distributing, AGBO will co-produce the Chris Hemsworth and Tiffany Haddish comedy Down Under Cover.

With A24 distributing, they are set to produce the sci-fi action film Everything Everywhere All at Once from directors Dan Kwan and Daniel Scheinert.

Several other films have been optioned by the company with no distribution deals currently set; an adaptation of Alex North's novel The Whisper Man with Mike Larocca and Malcolm Gray producing, All Fun and Games from writer JJ Braider, John Brancato's script The Last Neanderthal, and an American film adaptation of the Japanese anime series Battle of the Planets which the Russo Brothers may also direct. As well, they will produce a film about the Cambridge Analytica scandal with Matt Shakman in talks to direct and Christopher Markus and Stephen McFeely writing the screenplay.

On the television side, AGBO will produce an animated series based on Magic: The Gathering for Netflix, with a potential a live-action spinoff also in development. They will also produce Amazon's television series based on the graphic novel Grimjack.

In April 2020, it was announced that The Russos will team with Walt Disney Pictures to produce a live-action remake of the 1997 animated film Hercules.

In December 2020, it was announced that the Russos will direct an adaptation of Simon Stålenhag's graphic novel The Electric State for Universal Pictures with Millie Bobby Brown set to star. In June 2022, the film was moved to Netflix.

Productions

Films

Television series

References

External links
 Linkedin page

American companies established in 2016
2016 establishments in California
Companies based in Los Angeles
Privately held companies based in California
Entertainment companies based in California
Film production companies of the United States
Television production companies of the United States
Mass media companies established in 2016